Macedonians as an obsolete terminology was used in regional and in ethnographic sense and had several meanings, different from these used mostly today. The name of Macedonia was revived on the Balkans during the early 19th century as result of the Western Europe-derived obsession with Ancient Greece. The designation Macedonian arose at the eve of the 20th century and was used beyond but its meanings have changed during the time, and some of them are rarely used anymore.

Meanings

Umbrella term 

At first place it was an umbrella term to designate all the inhabitants of the region of Macedonia, regardless of their ethnic origin. "Macedonians" as an umbrella term covered Greeks, Bulgarians, Turks, Aromanians and Megleno-Romanians, Albanians, Serbs, etc. Simultaneously a political concept was created, to encompass all these "Macedonians" in the area, into a separate supranational entity, based on their collective Macedonian regional identity. The new state would to be cantonized, something as "Switzerland on the Balkans". An example is the bylaws of the Macedonian Patriotic Organization. As written originally during 1920s, the bylaws' concept of "Macedonians" had only geographic and not ethnographic meaning, and was equally valid for all ethnic groups in Macedonia. As a remnant from these times, even the latest version of this bylaws, from 2016, retains this very definition of the terms “Macedonians” and "Macedonian emigrants".

Slavic Macedonians 

At that time, this designation was used also to describe the Slavic speakers in Ottoman Macedonia, but not as a separate ethnic group, because this population was defined then mostly as Bulgarians, while their association with Bulgaria was universally accepted. However at that time the anarchist Pavel Shatev described the first vestiges of the process of an ethno-national differentiation between Bulgarian and Macedonian, while some people he met felt “only Bulgarians”, but others despite being Bulgarians "by nationality", felt themselves Macedonians above all. During the interbellum Bulgaria also stimulated to some extent the development of the Macedonian regional identity, especially in the Kingdom of Yugoslavia. Its aim was to prevent the Serbianization of the local Slavic Macedonians, because the very name Macedonia was prohibited there. Ultimately the designation Macedonian, changed its status in 1944, and went from being predominantly a regional, ethnographic denomination, to a national one. Nevertheless, among the older Macedonian immigrant communities, as for example in the USA and Canada, the terms Macedonian, Bulgarian and Macedonian Bulgarian, kept their similar meanings in the first decades after the Second World War.

Macedo-Romanians 

At the eve of the 20th century, the Bulgarian teacher Vasil Kanchov marked that the local Bulgarians and Aromanians called themselves "Macedonians", and that the surrounding people also called them in the same way. These "Vlachs" (Aromanians and Megleno-Romanians) tended to call themselves Macedonians after moving to urban areas. The urban Aromanians were usually pro-Greek. They also were called by the Romanians as "Macedo-Romanians" because some of them emigrated to Romania from Macedonia during the early 20th century. The designation "Macedonian" for them was also widespread in Romania. When the researcher Keith Brown visited North Macedonia on the eve of the 21st century, he realised that the local Aromanian dialect still had no way to distinguish "Macedonians" from "Bulgarians" and that the locals used the designation "Bulgarians" for both ethnic groups.

See also 
 Macedonian (disambiguation)
 Macedonia (terminology)
 Macedonian struggle

Notes 

History of Macedonia (region)
Aromanians